William Easton may refer to:
 William Easton (footballer) (born 1986), Scottish association football player
 William Easton (artist), Scottish artist, writer and curator
 William Easton (tennis), American tennis player
 William Bigelow Easton, mathematician
 Billy Easton (1904–c. 1982), English association football player
 William Easton, a fictional character from the Saw film franchise
 William Edgar Easton (1861–1936), American playwright and journalist